White Haven is an unincorporated community and census-designated place (CDP) in Lincoln County, Montana, United States. The population was 577 at the 2010 census.

Geography
White Haven is south of the center of Lincoln County, in the valley of Libby Creek. U.S. Route 2 passes through White Haven, leading north (westbound) to Libby and southeast  to Kalispell.

Via Libby Creek, the community is part of the Kootenai River watershed, flowing to the Columbia River.

Demographics

References

Census-designated places in Lincoln County, Montana
Census-designated places in Montana